Pedro Bank is a large bank of sand and coral, partially covered with seagrass, about 80 km south and southwest of Jamaica, rising steeply from a seabed of 800 metres depth. The total area of the bank within the  isobath measures .

Pedro Bank is a part of submarine Nicaragua Rise, which stretches from Cabo Gracias a Dios through Rosalind Bank to Jamaica.

History
Pedro Bank was originally named 'Viper Bank', by Spanish mariners because its shallow reefs, rocks and shoals are laid out in the shape of a gigantic serpent. It was once a busy and treacherous shipping passage used by seafaring Europeans in the sixteenth and seventeenth centuries; archaeologists estimate there are over 300 shipwrecks on the Bank.

Pedro Bank was annexed by the United Kingdom in 1863 and added to Jamaica in 1882.

Today the Bank is known for its economic and cultural importance; it is the main harvesting ground for Queen Conch in the Caribbean and is highly valued by Jamaica's fishing community who have been operating on the Bank and using its small Cays as a base since the 1920s.

Cays, rocks and reefs
The sparse land vegetation consists of six species of plants, none of which are endemic. The cays are regionally important seabird nesting and roosting areas (masked boobies, roseate terns and others) and also provide several endangered turtle species such as hawksbills and loggerheads with nesting grounds. The islets yield some guano and coconuts. More importantly, they represent the primary harvesting area for the largest export of Queen Conch from the Caribbean region. They were occupied by the British in 1863 and made part of Jamaica in 1882. They are considered part of the parish of Kingston, for all purposes except taxes.

There is a lighted beacon in the north.
A Jamaican Coast Guard station and a fishermen's camp with number of huts and a large shed are in the southeast.
This is the southernmost point of land of Jamaica.

In a wider sense, some over-water rocks, small outcrops of oolitic limestone over which water breaks, are considered part of the Pedro Cays:

The rock consists of two summits that lie in an east-west direction.
It is 0.5 m high.

There are several submarine features on Pedro Bank, such as:

It is the southernmost feature of Jamaica, not counting Alice Shoal, which is claimed by Jamaica but considered a part of Colombia.

References

External links
Sailing Directions, Caribbean Sea, Vol. I
Gazetteer: Geographic Names of Jamaica
Pedro Bank and Cays Management Area

Nature Conservancy: Pedro Bank
Article on Reef Assessment on Pedro Bank

Islands of Jamaica
Seabird colonies
Lists of coordinates
Former islands from the last glacial maximum

ku:Pedro Cays